Nannacara bimaculata is a species of cichlid endemic to Guyana where it is found in the Potaro and Essequibo rivers.  It grows to a length of  SL.  This species can also be found in the aquarium trade.

References

bimaculata
bimaculata
Fish described in 1912
Taxa named by Carl H. Eigenmann